The Cayoose Creek First Nation also known as the Cayoose Creek Indian Band, the Cayoose Creek Band, and the Sekw'el'wás First Nation, is a First Nations government in the Central Interior-Fraser Canyon region of the Canadian province of British Columbia.  The Cayoose Creek First Nation is a member government of the Lillooet Tribal Council, also known officially as the St'at'imc Nation (though without including all St'at'imc communities).

The Cayoose Creek First Nation's offices are located at Lillooet, British Columbia.

See also

St'at'imcets language
Bridge River Power Project

References

Indian and Northern Affairs Canada - First Nation Detail
Sekw'el'was website

St'at'imc governments
Lillooet Country
First Nations governments in the Fraser Canyon